This non-profit organisation (CIFIM) was founded in Tábor, Czech Republic, in  Baroque chateau (castle) in Tábor-Měšice.

Focus 

The CIFIM charter was registered by the Ministry of the Interior on October 23, 2000 (registration number: VS/1-1/45 046/00-R). Identification number (IČO): 70868581.

CIFIM is a non-profit charity concerned with humanities (political sciences, economy, and social relationships), research and publicity, Christian ethics, cultural and artistic activities (Art. III, par 1, Organisation Statute).

Sections of CIFIM 
Czech Institute for International Meetings consists of 4 sections (Art. IV, CIFIM sections):

 Human Rights and Education Association: international association in the Czech Republic dedicated to the legacy of John and Robert Kennedy's struggle for human rights and the education of the masses.
 Czech-German Meetings Club: the mission of the club is to break the stereotypes between Czechs and Germans, to increase co-operation in the newly integrated Europe (European Union), and to contribute to the security of and development in Central Europe.
 Ludwig Erhard Forum: economic, political, scientific and research-oriented activities in the field of economy in the spirit of the "Father of the German economic miracle" and the founder of "social market economy".
 Jan Bervida Society: culture, literature, arts, music and social development without boundaries for the sake of European and international integration.

Permanent exhibitions 
Konrad Adenauer - Person, Politician and European.
 The Occupation of Czechoslovakia through the soviet Red Army on August 21, 1968.
21 August 1968 - Soviet, Polish, Hungarian, Bulgarian and East German units commit aggression against Czechoslovakia by night.
John F. Kennedy and His Time.
Also the presentation of US historical shares, which belong to fame American Shareholders (coming soon) 2007.

Cooperation and Protectors 
European Parliament (Jaroslav Zvěřina - since 2005 "Jaroslav-Zvěřina-Series", Policy, Economy and Social Affairs), Czech Republic.
Konrad Adenauer Foundation (Common meetings and general support) in Berlin and Prague.

External links 
 CIFIM (English)
 CIFIM (German)

Non-profit organizations based in the Czech Republic